The Grand Prix du Parisien was  an annual road bicycle race held in Paris, France as a team time trial. Each team had six riders. The event was first held in 1961 and for the final time in 1965. From 1963 to 1965 it was part of the Super Prestige Pernod series.

Winners

References

Cycle races in France
Defunct cycling races in France
Super Prestige Pernod races
Sports competitions in Paris
Recurring sporting events established in 1961
1961 establishments in France
Recurring sporting events disestablished in 1965
1965 disestablishments in France